Limak Holding A.S. is a Turkish conglomerate, with major interests in construction, energy, cement, and tourism. Its assets include the Limak Cement and Limak Energy companies and the Limak Tourism Group. In 2012, it had around $260m revenue from construction.

Limak was launched in 1976 by Sezai Bacaksız and Nihat Özdemir, with Özdemir focussing on cement and energy while Bacaksız focussed on airports and tourism.

Recent history
In May 2013 Limak Holding was part of a joint venture which won the EUR22bn contract to construct a third international airport in Istanbul. The group had previously been part of a joint venture which in 2007 won a 20-year concession to operate Sabiha Gökçen International Airport, and in 2007, together with French firm Aéroport de Lyon, won the concession tender for Pristina International Airport Adem Jashari.

In July 2013, it was part of a joint venture which acquired the daily newspaper Akşam, together with TV channel Sky Turk 360 and radio station Alem FM, for TL60m. 

In December 2013 Nihat Özdemir was among the 41 suspects who were issued arrest orders in the second corruption probe. «Prosecutors also appear to be targeting construction companies involved in some of the government’s showpiece infrastructure projects. Those named in media reports included Nihat Ozdemir, head of Limak Group, part of a consortium that won the €22 billion tender to build Istanbul’s third airport». In 2011 Özdemir and Bacaksız were listed as billionaires by Forbes.

It is part owner with IC Holding of two coal-fired power stations in Turkey, Kemeköy power station and Yeniköy power station.

Within the scope of the 'Our Love, Our Energy is with You' project, which was started in 2021, the company provided food and water aid to stray animals that had difficulty in finding food due to the cold weather in the winter months.

References

External links
Official Website

Conglomerate companies of Turkey
Construction and civil engineering companies of Turkey
Holding companies of Turkey
Companies based in Ankara
Conglomerate companies established in 1976
Construction and civil engineering companies established in 1976
Turkish companies established in 1976
Coal companies of Turkey